Princess Helena Victoria of Schleswig-Holstein  (Victoria Louise Sophia Augusta Amelia Helena; 3 May 1870 – 13 March 1948) was a granddaughter of Queen Victoria of the United Kingdom. From 1917 her name was simply Princess Helena Victoria.

Early life
Princess Helena Victoria (always known to her family as Thora) was born at Frogmore House, near Windsor Castle. Her father was Prince Christian of Schleswig-Holstein-Sonderburg-Augustenburg, the third son of Christian, Duke of Augustenburg and Countess Louise af Danneskjold-Samsøe. Her mother was Princess Helena, the fifth child and third daughter of Queen Victoria and Prince Albert of Saxe-Coburg and Gotha. Her parents resided in Britain from marriage.

She was baptised in the private chapel at Windsor Castle on 20 June 1870. Her godparents were Queen Victoria, the Duchess of Cambridge, Princess Louise, Prince Arthur, Prince Leopold, Prince Valdemar of Denmark, Prince Edward of Saxe-Weimar, Princess Louise Auguste of Schleswig-Holstein and Princess Caroline Amelie of Schleswig-Holstein (the latter two represented by the Duchess of Roxburghe). 

She was a bridesmaid at the 1885 wedding of her maternal aunt Princess Beatrice to Prince Henry of Battenberg and also at the wedding of her cousins the Duke and Duchess of York (future  George V and Queen Mary) in 1893.

She spent most of her childhood at Cumberland Lodge, her father's residence as Ranger of Windsor Great Park. Known to her family as "Thora", or sometimes "Snipe", in reference to her sharp facial features, formally she used the names "Helena Victoria" from among her string of six given names.

First World War
In July 1917, King George V changed the name of the British royal family to the House of Windsor. He also relinquished, on behalf of himself and his numerous cousins who were British subjects, the use of their German titles, styles, and surnames. Princess Helena Victoria and her younger sister, Princess Marie Louise, thereupon ceased to use the territorial designation "of Schleswig-Holstein-Sonderburg-Augustenburg". Instead, they became known simply as "Her Highness Princess Helena Victoria" and "Her Highness Princess Marie Louise". Although the two had borne German titles, their upbringing and domicile were entirely English.

Later life
Princess Helena Victoria never married. She followed her mother's example in working for various charitable organizations, most notably YMCA, Young Women's Christian Association (YWCA) and Princess Christian's Nursing Home at Windsor. During World War I, she founded the YWCA Women's Auxiliary Force. As its president, she visited British troops in France and obtained the permission of the Secretary of State for War, Lord Kitchener, to arrange entertainments for them. Between the world wars, she and her sister, Princess Marie Louise, were enthusiastic patrons of music at Schomberg House, their London residence. It was reported in one publication in 1924 that 'Princess Helena Victoria has always been, together with her sister Princess Marie Louise, one of the hardest working of all our princesses.'  After a German air raid damaged the house in 1940, the two princesses moved to Fitzmaurice Place, Berkeley Square.

In ill health and a wheelchair user after World War II, Princess Helena Victoria made one of her last major appearances at the 20 November 1947 wedding of her first cousin twice removed Princess Elizabeth, to Prince Philip of Greece and Denmark. 

Princess Helena Victoria died at Fitzmaurice Place, Berkeley Square on 13 March 1948.  She died at the age of 77, the same age at which her mother, Princess Helena, had also died.  The Princess's funeral took place at St. George's Chapel, Windsor on Wednesday 17 March 1948 at 11:30am.  Her coffin was draped in the Union Jack with a wreath of daffodils and spring flowers from her sister Princess Marie Louise and a wreath of yellow roses and mauve tulips from King George VI and Queen Elizabeth.  Amongst the mourners were her sister Princess Marie Louise, George VI, Queen Elizabeth, Princess Elizabeth and the Duke of Edinburgh, Queen Mary was represented by Captain the Lord Claud Hamilton.  Other royal mourners included Princess Alice, Duchess of Gloucester, Princess Marina, Duchess of Kent, Alexander Mountbatten, 1st Marquess of Carisbrooke, David Mountbatten, 3rd Marquess of Milford Haven, Lady Patricia Ramsay and her son Captain Alexander Ramsay.  Music included a setting of Psalm 121 'I will lift up mine eyes', and the hymns 'Rock of Ages' and 'God be in my head'.  Her coffin was later buried at the Royal Burial Ground, Frogmore, Windsor Great Park. No orders for court mourning were issued but the King and Queen, and members of their Households, observed family mourning for one week.  Probate of the Princess's estate was granted in London on 20 May 1948 and it was valued at £52,435 (£1.3 million at 2022 conversion rates).

Titles, styles, honours and arms

Titles and styles
 3 May 1870 – 14 July 1917: Her Highness Princess Victoria of Schleswig-Holstein
 14 July 1917 – 13 March 1948: Her Highness Princess Helena Victoria

As a male-line granddaughter of the Duke of Schleswig-Holstein, Princess Helena Victoria would have been styled Serene Highness (Durchlaucht). In May 1866, Queen Victoria had conferred the higher style of Highness upon any children to be born of the marriage of Princess Helena and Prince Christian, although the children were to remain Prince or Princess of Schleswig-Holstein. In June 1917, a notice appeared in the Court Circular that a Royal Warrant was to be prepared by George V dispensing with his cousins' use of the "Schleswig-Holstein-Sonderburg-Augustenburg" part of their titles. However no warrant was issued, nor were they formally granted the titles of Princesses of Great Britain and Ireland nor of the United Kingdom.

Honours
British honours
VA: Lady of the Order of Victoria and Albert 1883
CI: Lady of the Order of the Crown of India 1889
RRC: Decoration of the Royal Red Cross 16 March 1900
GBE: Dame Grand Cross of the Order of the British Empire 1918
GCStJ: Dame Grand Cross of the Order of St John 1928
Foreign honours
  Dame of the Royal Order of Queen Maria Luisa

Ancestry

Notes

Sources
Ronald Allison and Sarah Riddell, eds., The Royal Encyclopedia (London: Macmillan, 1992).
"Obituary: Princess Helena Victoria, Charity and Social Services," 15 March 1948, p. 7.
"Royal Titles: German Names Dropped, British Peerages for Princes," The Times 20 July 1917, p. 7.

British princesses
House of Augustenburg
Dames Grand Cross of the Order of the British Empire
Ladies of the Royal Order of Victoria and Albert
Companions of the Order of the Crown of India
Dames Grand Cross of the Order of St John
1870 births
1948 deaths
People from Old Windsor
People from Windsor, Berkshire
Princesses of Schleswig-Holstein-Sonderburg-Augustenburg
Burials at the Royal Burial Ground, Frogmore
Members of the Royal Red Cross
YMCA leaders
Royal reburials